GBLA-24 (Ghanche-III) is a constituency of Gilgit Baltistan Legislative Assembly which is currently represented by Engr Muhammad Ismail of Pakistan Peoples Party.

Members

Election results

1994
Engr Muhammad Ismail Independent became member of Gilgit Baltistan Counsel by getting 3,770 votes.

1999
Engr Muhammad Ismail of Pakistan Peoples Party became member of Gilgit Baltistan Counsel by getting 4,030 votes.

2004
Engr Muhammad Ismail of Pakistan Peoples Party became member of Gilgit Baltistan Counsel by getting 4,340 votes.

2009
Engr Muhammad Ismail of Pakistan Peoples Party became member of assembly by getting 4,770 votes.

2015
Mohammad Shafiq of Pakistan Muslim League (N) won this seat by getting 5,226 votes.

2020

Engr Mohammad Ismail of Pakistan Peoples Party won this seat by getting 6,239 votes.

References

Gilgit-Baltistan Legislative Assembly constituencies